Alexis Mauricio Montes Renderos (born 1 June 1998) is a Salvadoran professional footballer who plays as a left-back for Primera División club Alianza and the El Salvador national team.

Career
Renderos began his senior career with Alianza, before moving to Sonsonate in 2019. After a couple seasons as the starter for Sonsonate, he returned to Alianza for the 2021–22 season on 3 June 2021.

International career
Renderos debuted with the El Salvador national team in a 0–0 friendly tie with Guatemala on 27 June 2021. He was called up to represent El Salvador at the 2021 CONCACAF Gold Cup.

References

External links
 
 

1998 births
Living people
People from La Paz Department (El Salvador)
Salvadoran footballers
El Salvador international footballers
El Salvador youth international footballers
Association football fullbacks
Alianza F.C. footballers
C.D. Sonsonate footballers
Salvadoran Primera División players
2021 CONCACAF Gold Cup players